Pain (typeset as PAIN) is a musical project from Sweden that mixes heavy metal with influences from electronic music and techno. The project started out as a hobby project for frontman Peter Tägtgren, whose idea was to fuse heavy metal with 1980s-inspired electro-industrial and techno influences. Tägtgren, who is also the vocalist/guitarist of Hypocrisy and producer of his own The Abyss studios, is the only current member.

History

Pain's self-titled debut was released in 1997, and since then Pain has released six more albums and a DVD. Starting with their second, all of Pain's albums have made the Swedish charts, thanks in large part to hit singles such as "End of the Line", "Shut Your Mouth", and "Same Old Song". In early February 2006, Blabbermouth.net reported that Pain had signed with Roadrunner Records. Currently, Pain is under the Nuclear Blast Records banner.
In 2008, Pain was on tour as a supporting performer for the Finnish symphonic power metal band Nightwish. During this tour singer Peter Tägtgren, drummer David Wallin, and bassist Johan Husgafvel were assaulted by a gang in Leipzig. Tägtgren received 10 stitches in his face, Wallin suffered a concussion and stitches to his head, and Husgafvel had his nose broken.

Pain supported Nightwish on the second half of their Dark Passion Play World Tour, along with Finnish pop rock band Indica, beginning with the first show in London, UK on 11 March 2009. Pain released their seventh album, You Only Live Twice, on 3 June 2011 via Nuclear Blast. They released their eighth studio album entitled Coming Home on 9 September 2016.

Discography

Studio albums

Singles

Video albums

Music videos

Members

Current members
Peter Tägtgren – vocals, all instruments on CD (1996–present)

Current touring musicians
David Wallin – drums (2003–present)
Jonathan Olsson – bass (2016–present)
Sebastian Svalland – guitars (2019–present)
Sebastian Tägtgren – drums (drums on Coming Home) (2016–present)

Former touring musicians
Saroth (Yngve Liljebäck) – bass (1999-2005)
Mathias Kamijo – guitars (1999-2003)
Horgh (Reidar Horghagen) – drums (1999-2003)
Andrea Odendahl – guitars (2003-2007)
Alla Fedynitch – bass (2005-2007)
Marcus Jidell – guitars (2007)
André Skaug – bass (2007/2011)
René Sebastian – guitars (2007)
Michael Bohlin – guitars (2007–2016) 
Johan Husgafvel – bass (2007–2016)
Greger Andersson – guitars (2016–2019)

References

External links

 
 

Musical groups established in 1997
Industrial metal musical groups
Swedish heavy metal musical groups
Swedish alternative metal musical groups
Nuclear Blast artists
Electronic rock musical groups
Metal Mind Productions artists